

543001–543100 

|-id=060
| 543060 Liefke ||  || Carolin Liefke (born 1981) is an astronomer and astronomy educator at Haus der Astronomie in Heidelberg. She has used the telescope that was used to discover this asteroid in educational activities.
 || 
|}

543101–543200 

|-id=198
| 543198 Rastislavmráz ||  || Rastislav Mráz shihan (1897–1968) is a former Slovakian Karate champion. || 
|}

543201–543300 

|-bgcolor=#f2f2f2
| colspan=4 align=center | 
|}

543301–543400 

|-id=302
| 543302 Hamvasbéla ||  || Béla Hamvas (1897–1968) was a Hungarian writer, philosopher, and social critic. || 
|-id=315
| 543315 Asmakhammari ||  || Asma Khammari-Steinhausser (born 1982) is a French promoter of scientific outreach. || 
|}

543401–543500 

|-bgcolor=#f2f2f2
| colspan=4 align=center | 
|}

543501–543600 

|-id=581
| 543581 Laurenrubyjane ||  || Lauren Ruby Jane Forward (born 2006) is the granddaughter of British amateur astronomer Norman Falla, who discovered this minor planet. || 
|}

543601–543700 

|-id=698
| 543698 Miromesaroš ||  || Miroslav "Miro" Mesaroš (born 1967), a Slovak mathematics and physics teacher and popularizer of astronomy. || 
|}

543701–543800 

|-bgcolor=#f2f2f2
| colspan=4 align=center | 
|}

543801–543900 

|-bgcolor=#f2f2f2
| colspan=4 align=center | 
|}

543901–544000 

|-id=914
| 543914 Tessedik ||  || Sámuel Tessedik (1742–1820) was a Slovak Lutheran pastor, school founder, teacher and economic writer. || 
|}

References 

543001-544000